Pawan Gupta  is a sanda fighter from India. He won a bronze medal  at the 2012 Asian Wushu Championships held in Hanoi, Vietnam in men's Sanda 65 kg in. He represented India and won a silver medal in the Asian Sanda Championships, held in Singapore. Gupta is currently working with Indian Air Force since 2014.

Career 
In the 8th Asian Wushu Championships held in Hanoi, Vietnam, Gupta won a bronze medal. In the 2015 National Games of India, which was held in Kerala, India, he won a bronze medal. In 2017, he won a silver medal at the  Asian Sanda Championships, which was held in Singapore.

At the 2017 International Wushu Championships, held in Armenia, where he competed in the 70 kg men's category and won a bronze medal. He represented India at the Shanghai Cooperation Organisation's International Wushu Sanda Tournament in the men's 75 kg in 2018, where he was placed third. A year later, in 2019, Pawan competed in the Batumi Open International Wushu Tournament, held in Batumi, Georgia, where he won a silver medal.

See also 
 Kuldeep Handoo
 Praveen Kumar (Wushu)

References

External links 
 India has a bright scope in Wushu says Pawan Gupta at Daily Excelsior

Living people
Indian sanshou practitioners
Martial artists from Uttar Pradesh
Indian Air Force officers
People from Uttar Pradesh
Year of birth missing (living people)
Wushu practitioners in India
Indian wushu practitioners